Yancey may refer to:

People 

Bartlett Yancey (1785–1828), American politician 
Benjamin Cudworth Yancey Jr. (1817–1891), American politician during the Civil War 
Bert Yancey (1938–1994), American golfer
DeAngelo Yancey (born 1994), American football wide-receiver 
George Yancey (born 1962), American sociologist
J Dilla (born James Yancey) (1974–2006), American music producer 
Jean Yancey (1914–2000), American women's small business consultant and motivational speaker
Jimmy Yancey (died 1951), American pianist 
Illa J (born John Derek Yancey, 1986), American rapper 
Lovie Yancey (1912–2008), American businesswoman, founder of Fatburger
Philip Yancey (born 1949), American writer
Rick Yancey (born 1962), American novelist
Scott Yancey (born 1969), American TV personality and businessman
William Lowndes Yancey (1814–1863), Alabama politician who supported secession
Yancey Arias (born 1971), American actor
Yancey McGill (born 1952), American politician
Yancey Thigpen (born 1969), American football wide-receiver
Yancy (musician) (born 1980), American Christian music artist

Places 

Yancey, Kentucky
Yancey County, North Carolina
Yanceyville, North Carolina

Other 
 USS Yancey (AKA-93), an Andromeda-class attack cargo ship
 Yancey Boys, an album by Illa J